The Bombing of Jaén was an aerial attack on the city of Jaén on 1 April 1937, during the Spanish Civil War, by the Condor Legion of Nazi Germany, who fought for the rebels. The bombing was ordered by the General Queipo de Llano, as retaliation for a Republican air raid on the city of Córdoba.

The bombing
On 1 April 1937, six German Ju 52 bombers of the Nationalist Air Force, escorted by six Heinkel He 51 and three CR 32  fighters, bombed the city of Jaén,  which had no legitimate military targets or anti-aircraft defenses. Current estimates indicated there were 159 deaths among the civilian population and several hundred injured,  comparable with the Bombing of Guernica, which occurred four weeks later.

Aftermath
As a reprisal, the local republican authorities executed 128 Nationalist prisoners.

See also
Condor Legion
Spanish Civil War

Notes

Explosions in 1937
Mass murder in 1937
Battles of the Spanish Civil War
1937 in Spain
Spanish Civil War massacres
Conflicts in 1937
History of Andalusia
Jaén, Spain
Airstrikes during the Spanish Civil War
April 1937 events
Airstrikes conducted by Spain